John Larry Jefferson (né Washington; born February 3, 1956) is an American former professional football player who was a wide receiver in the National Football League (NFL). After playing college football with the Arizona State Sun Devils, he was selected in the first round of the 1978 NFL Draft by the San Diego Chargers. He played three seasons in San Diego, where he became the first NFL player to gain 1,000 receiving yards in each of his first three seasons. He was traded to the Green Bay Packers after a contract dispute with the Chargers, and later finished his playing career with the Cleveland Browns.

College career

After graduating from Franklin D. Roosevelt High School in the Oak Cliff neighborhood of Dallas, Jefferson received a scholarship to attend Arizona State University. He played for the Sun Devils from 1974 to 1977. Jefferson's breakout year occurred in his sophomore season (1975) when he led the team with 52 receptions and 921 yards receiving on the way to a perfect 12-0 season and an appearance in the Fiesta Bowl, where he was also named Most Valuable Player. ASU finished second in the national polls, its highest ranking in history.

A consensus All-American selection in 1977 and two-time All-Western Athletic Conference pick, Jefferson concluded his career with an NCAA record 42 consecutive games with a reception. He remains the ASU leader in career receptions with 188 and career receiving yardage with 2,993. Recognized as Arizona Amateur Athlete of the Year in 1977, he was twice selected as the Sun Devils Most Valuable Player and led the team in receiving all four years.

Statistics

Career Arizona State Statistics
 1974: 30 receptions, 423 yards, 1 TD.
 1975: 52 receptions, 921 yards, 6 TDs
 1976: 48 receptions, 681 yards, 5 TDs
 1977: 58 receptions, 968 yards, 8 TDs
 Totals: 188 receptions, 2,993 yards, 20 TDs

Professional career

San Diego Chargers
After his senior year at Arizona State, Jefferson was drafted fourteenth overall in the 1978 NFL Draft by the San Diego Chargers. Jefferson would appear in four Pro Bowls during his career. He, along with Charlie Joiner, Kellen Winslow and Wes Chandler (who replaced him on the Chargers) represented one of the most potent receiving corps of the early 1980s, known as Air Coryell. Jefferson was known for making spectacular catches with his body control and great hands.

On October 15, 1978, against the Miami Dolphins, he was blinded after being poked in the eye while going up for a wobbly pass from quarterback Dan Fouts. He missed the next two games before returning, wearing prescription goggles for protection. On November 12 against the Kansas City Chiefs, Jefferson caught a 14-yard touchdown pass with no time remaining while slipping in a wet end zone for a 29–23 overtime victory. On December 4, he caught 7 passes for 155 yards and 1 touchdown against the Chicago Bears.  He had eight touchdowns in the final six games of the year. Jefferson finished his rookie season with 56 receptions for 1,001 yards and a league-leading 13 receiving touchdowns, which was tied for the NFL record for most receiving touchdowns by a rookie with Billy Howton from 1952, until broken by Randy Moss in 1998.  Jefferson was one of four NFL receivers to finish the season with 1,000 yards, and he set the Chargers' single-season, rookie record for yards receiving, which stood until Keenan Allen's 1,046 in 2013. Jefferson earned second-team All-Pro honors and was named to the Pro Bowl. He appeared on the cover of the August 20, 1979 issue of Sports Illustrated with the headline "The Touchdown Man."

Jefferson was a first-team All-Pro in each of the next two seasons and led the NFL in receiving yards (1,340) and receiving touchdowns (13) in 1980. He became the first NFL player with at least 1,000 yards receiving in each of his first three seasons. In a September 14, 1980, overtime game against the Oakland Raiders, played in San Diego, Jefferson out-leaped Lester Hayes for a throw from Dan Fouts. Jefferson landed at about the Oakland 3-yard line. Hayes stood over Jefferson, stunned that Jefferson had taken the ball away while Jefferson rolled untouched into the end zone, sealing a 30-24 San Diego Chargers' overtime victory.  While in San Diego, Jefferson also became known as the "Space-Age Receiver" due to the futuristic-looking goggles he wore. With his acrobatic catches and fiery enthusiasm before games, he became a fan favorite in San Diego. Jefferson caught a pass in 44 of his 45 regular season starts with San Diego. He did not catch a pass on September 16, 1979, against the Buffalo Bills, who double-teamed him. The Chargers did not target him on any pass plays, but the attention he drew instead helped the team rush for 245 yards.

Jefferson did not report to the Chargers in 1981 due to a contract dispute. He insisted that San Diego renegotiate his contract, contending that at least three other receivers in the league were paid more than him.

Green Bay Packers

On September 17, 1981, the Chargers traded Jefferson to the Green Bay Packers after he stated the day before that he could not play for San Diego. With the Packers, Jefferson starred opposite future Pro Football Hall of Fame wideout James Lofton. Jefferson, Lofton, and tight end Paul Coffman teamed up with quarterback Lynn Dickey to give the Packers one of the most explosive passing attacks in the NFL at the time; however, a defense which hovered near the bottom of the league relegated Green Bay to three 8-8 finishes and a second-round playoff appearance during the strike-shortened 1982 season.

Cleveland Browns
Jefferson played his final season for the Cleveland Browns in 1985. In seven games, he had three receptions for 30 yards.

Houston Oilers
Jefferson signed with the Houston Oilers in 1986, but was waived before the start of the regular season. He subsequently retired.

Later years
After his retirement, Jefferson graduated from Arizona State in 1989 with a B.A. in History. He was inducted into the Arizona State Hall of Fame in 1979 and the College Football Hall of Fame in 2002.

He has remained active in the football community; after retiring, Jefferson became an assistant coach at the University of Kansas and was the director of player development for the Washington Redskins until the end of the 2008–2009 season.

References

External links

 ASU Collegiate Biography
 

1956 births
Living people
All-American college football players
American football wide receivers
Arizona State Sun Devils football players
Kansas Jayhawks football coaches
San Diego Chargers players
Green Bay Packers players
Cleveland Browns players
American Conference Pro Bowl players
National Conference Pro Bowl players
College Football Hall of Fame inductees